Isaac Newton composed Principia Mathematica during 1685 and 1686, and it was published in a first edition on 5 July 1687. Widely regarded as one of the most important works in both the science of physics and in applied mathematics during the Scientific Revolution, the work underlies much of the technological and scientific advances from the Industrial Revolution (usually dated from 1750) which it helped to create.

Authoring Principia

Work begins

Between 1685 and 1686, Newton had a very extensive correspondence with John Flamsteed, who was then the astronomer-royal.

Many of the letters are lost, but it is clear that Flamsteed was helpful, especially regarding Kepler's definition of Saturn. The publication of Newton's discoveries led to controversies involving English
natural philosopher Robert Hooke,  Anthony Lucas, mathematical professor at Liege; Francis Line,
a physician in Liége, and many others. English astronomer and mathematician Edmond Halley attempted to mediate and get Newton to agree that Hooke deserved some credit for the invention of "the rule for the decrease of gravity being reciprocally as the squares of the distances from the centre". Halley acknowledged that although Hooke should be credited for the theory, "the demonstration of the curves generated thereby belonged wholly to Newton". In a letter, Newton responded to Halley as follows:

"Sir, In order to let you know the case between Mr Hooke and me, I give you an account of what passed between us in our letters, so far as I could remember; for 'tis long since they were writ, and I do not know that I have seen them since. I am almost confident by circumstances, that Sir Chr. Wren knew the duplicate proportion when I gave him a visit; and then Mr Hooke (by his book Cometa written afterwards) will prove the last of us three that knew it. I intended in this letter to let you understand the case fully; but it being a frivolous business, I shall content myself to give you, the heads of it in short, viz, that I never extended the duplicate proportion lower than to the superficies of the earth, and before a certain demonstration I found the last year, have suspected it did not reach accurately enough down so low; and therefore in the doctrine of projectiles never used it nor considered the motions of the heavens; and consequently Mr Hooke could not from my letters, which were about projectiles and the regions descending hence to the centre, conclude me ignorant of the theory of the heavens. That what he told me of the duplicate proportion was erroneous, namely, that it reached down from hence to the centre of the earth. 
"That it is not candid to require me now to confess myself, in print, then ignorant of the duplicate proportion in the heavens; for no other reason but because he had told it me in the case of projectiles, and so upon mistaken grounds, accused me of that ignorance. That in my answer to his first letter I refused his correspondence, told him I had laid philosophy aside, sent him, only the experiment of projectiles (rather shortly hinted than carefully described), in compliment to sweeten my answer, expected to hear no further from him; could scarce persuade myself to answer his second letter; did not answer his third, was upon other things; thought no further of philosophical matters than, his letters put me upon it, and therefore may be allowed not to have had my thoughts of that kind about me so well at that time.  That by the same reason he concludes me then ignorant of the rest of the duplicate proportion, he may as well conclude me ignorant of the rest of that theory I had read before in his books. That in one of my papers writ (I cannot say in what year, but I am sure some time before I had any correspondence with Mr Oldenburg, and that's above fifteen years ago), the proportion of the forces of the planets from the sun, reciprocally duplicate of their distances from him, is expressed, and the proportion of our gravit to the moon's conatus recedendi a centro terrae is calculated, though not accurately enough.  That when Hugenius put out his Horol. Oscill., a copy being presented to me, in my letter of thanks to him I gave those rules in the end thereof a particular commendation for their usefulness in Philosophy, and added out of my aforesaid paper an instance of their usefulness, in comparing the forces of the moon from the earth, and earth from the sun; in determining a problem about the moon's phase, and putting a limit to the sun's parallax, which shows that I had then my eye upon comparing the forces of the planets arising from their circular motion, and understood it; so that a while after, when Mr Hooke propounded the problem solemnly, in the end of his attempt to prove the motion of the earth, if I had not known the duplicate proportion before, I could not but have found it now. 
Between ten and eleven years ago there was an hypothesis of mine registered in your books, wherein I hinted a cause of gravity towards the earth, sun and planets, with the dependence of the celestial motions thereon; in which the proportion of the decrease of gravity from the superficies of the planet (though for brevity's sake not there expressed) can be no other than reciprocally duplicate of the distance from the centre. And I hope I shall not be urged to declare, in print, that I understood not the obvious mathematical condition of my own hypothesis. But, grant I received it afterwards from Mr Hooke, yet have I as great a right to it as to the ellipse. For as Kepler knew the orb to be not circular but oval, and guessed it to be elliptical, so Mr Hooke, without knowing what I have found out since his letters to me, can know no more, but that the proportion was duplicate quam proximè at great distances from the centre, and only guessed it to be so accurately, and guessed amiss in extending that proportion down to the very centre, whereas Kepler guessed right at the ellipse. And so, Mr Hooke found less of the proportion than Kepler of the ellipse. 
"There is so strong an objection against the accurateness of this proportion, that without my demonstrations, to which Mr Hooke is yet a stranger, it cannot be believed by a judicious philosopher to be any where accurate. And so, in stating this business, I do pretend to have done as much for the proportion as for the ellipsis, and to have as much right to the one from Mr Hooke and all men, as to the other from Kepler; and therefore on this account also he must at least moderate his pretences. 
"The proof you sent me I like very well. I designed the whole to consist of three books; the second was finished last summer being short, and only wants transcribing, and drawing the cuts fairly. Some new propositions I have since thought on, which I can as well let alone. The third wants the theory of comets. In autumn last I spent two months in calculations to no purpose for want of a good method, which made me afterwards return to the first book, and enlarge it with diverse propositions some relating to comets others to other things, found out last winter. The third I now design to suppress. Philosophy is such an impertinently litigious lady, that a man has as good be engaged in lawsuits, as have to do, with her. I found it so formerly, and now I am no sooner come near her again, but she gives me warning. The two first books, without the third, will not so well bear the title of Philosophiae Naturalis Principia Mathematica; and therefore I had altered it to this, De Motu Corporum libri duo. 
"But, upon second thoughts, I retain the former title. It will help the sale of the book, which I ought not to diminish now it's yours. The articles are with the largest to be called by that name. 
"If you please you may change the word to sections, though it be not material. In the first page, I have struck out the words uti posthac docebitur as referring to the third book; which is all at present, from your affectionate friend, and humble servant, 
"Is. NEWTON." 

On 20 June 1686, Halley responded to Newton:

"I am heartily sorry that in this matter, wherein all mankind ought to acknowledge their obligations to you, you should meet with anything that should give you unquiet"

(after an account of Hooke's claim to the discovery as made at a meeting of the Royal Society, he concludes)

"But I found that they were all of opinion that nothing thereof appearing in print, nor on the books of the Society, you ought to be considered as the inventor. And if in truth he knew it before you, he ought not to blame any but himself for having taken no more care to secure a discovery, which he puts so much value on. What application he has made in private, I know not; but I am sure that the Society have a very great satisfaction, in the honour you do them, by the dedication of so worthy a treatise. 
Sir, I must now again beg you, not to let your resentments run so high, as to deprive us of your third book, wherein the application of your mathematical doctrine to the theory of comets and several curious experiments, which, as I guess by what you write, ought to compose it, will undoubtedly render it acceptable to those, who will call themselves Philosophers without Mathematics, which are much the greater number. Now you approve of the character and paper, I will push on the edition vigorously. I have sometimes had thoughts of having the cuts neatly done in wood, so as to stand in the page with the demonstrations. It will be more convenient, and not much more charge. If it please you to have it so, I will try how well it can be done; otherwise I will have them in somewhat a larger size than those you have sent up. 
I am, Sir, your most affectionate humble servant, E. HALLEY." 

On 30 June 1686 the council resolved to license Newton's book, entitled Philosophiae Naturalis Principia Mathematica.

See also
After the publication of the Aman Philosophiæ Naturalis Principia Mathematica, Isaac Newton had his personal copy interleaved with blank pages to allow him space to make notes and alterations prior to publishing the second edition in 1713.

References

Isaac Newton